is a Japanese actress. Until 2016, she was represented by Platinum Production.

Biography
Nishihira entered the entertainment industry in 2009, after being scouted by Platinum Production. In March 2010,  Nishihira was included in Miss Magazine's Best 16 of 2010.

Filmography

Films

TV dramas

Stage

Direct-to-video

Internet

Other TV programmes

Television advertisements

Video games

Advertising

Music videos

References

Japanese television personalities
Actresses from Kanagawa Prefecture
1992 births
Living people